The Bishop of Aberdeen (originally Bishop of Mortlach, in Latin Murthlacum) was the ecclesiastical head of the Diocese of Aberdeen, one of Scotland's 13 medieval bishoprics, whose first recorded bishop is an early 12th-century cleric named Nechtan. It appears that the episcopal seat had previously been at Mortlach (Mòrthlach), but was moved to Aberdeen during the reign of King David I of Scotland. The names of three bishops of Mortlach are known, the latter two of whom, "Donercius" and "Cormauch" (Cormac), by name only. The Bishop of Aberdeen broke communion with the Roman Catholic Church after the Scottish Reformation.  Following the Revolution of 1688, the office was abolished in the Church of Scotland, but continued in the Scottish Episcopal Church. A Roman Catholic diocese was recreated in Aberdeen in 1878.

Pre-Reformation bishops

List of known bishops of Mortlach

List of known bishops of Aberdeen
The Bishopric of Aberdeen, as the Bishopric of Aberdeen, appears to date from the 1130s, as does the list of known bishops.

Post-Reformation bishops

Church of Scotland succession

Scottish Episcopal Church succession

Restored Roman Catholic succession
(Any dates appearing in italics indicate de facto  continuation of office.  The start date of tenure below is the date of appointment or succession. Where known, the date of installation and ordination as bishop are listed in the notes together with the post held prior to appointment.)

The modern Bishop of Aberdeen is the Ordinary of the Roman Catholic Diocese of Aberdeen in the Province of Saint Andrews and Edinburgh. The diocese covers 29,068 km².  The see is in the City of Aberdeen where the seat is located at the Cathedral Church of Saint Mary of the Assumption. The Apostolic Vicariate of the Northern District (formerly the Apostolic Vicariate of the Highland District) was elevated to diocese status on 4 March 1878.  The current bishop is the Right Reverend Hugh Gilbert, 11th Bishop of Aberdeen.

See also
Bishops in the Church of Scotland

References

Bibliography

External links
Dauvit Broun's list of 12th century Scottish Bishops

 Bishop of Aberdeen